Sergio Giavanni Kitchens (born June 14, 1993), known professionally as Gunna, is an American rapper, singer, and songwriter. He is signed to Young Thug's record label YSL Records, as well as 300 Entertainment and Atlantic Records. He released his debut studio album, Drip or Drown 2 in 2019 and followed it up with his second studio album Wunna in 2020, which debuted atop the Billboard 200. His third album DS4Ever was released in 2022, becoming his second consecutive number one album.

Early life
Gunna was born in College Park, Georgia. He was raised by his mother and has four older brothers. He started making music at age fifteen. He grew up listening to Cam'ron, Chingy and Outkast, among others. Gunna attended North Springs Charter School of Arts and Sciences and Langston Hughes High School. In 2013, Gunna released the mixtape Hard Body under the name Yung Serg.

Career

2016–2018: Career beginnings and Drip Season series 
Gunna was introduced to fellow rapper Young Thug through Keith "King" Troup, a mutual friend and community figure who died in December 2015. He was later featured alongside rappers Travis Scott and Gucci Mane on Thug's song, "Floyd Mayweather", from his commercial mixtape Jeffery.

On October 14, 2016, Gunna released his debut mixtape Drip Season through YSL Records. It featured members from YSL, such as Young Thug, Lil Duke, and Nechie. He released the mixtape Drip Season 2 on May 11, 2017. It featured many popular Atlanta and YSL artists such as Young Thug, Playboi Carti, and Offset. From the mixtape, "YSL", featuring Playboi Carti, was on a "Grand Theft Auto" radio station. On November 30, 2017, he released his debut extended play Drip or Drown, in which his record producer and close friend Wheezy entirely produced it, with a sole guest appearance from Young Thug.

On February 2, 2018, he released the commercial mixtape Drip Season 3. It featured notable guest appearances from Hoodrich Pablo Juan, Lil Durk, Nav, Metro Boomin, and Lil Yachty, while the deluxe edition featured additional appearances from Lil Uzi Vert, Young Jordan, Young Thug, and Lil Baby. The regular and deluxe editions were simultaneously released together.

On April 17, 2018, Gunna released a single titled "Sold Out Dates!" featuring Lil Baby, a close friend and frequent collaborator. The song became one of his mainstream recordings and received millions of streams on platforms like YouTube and SoundCloud. It was eventually released as a non-album single after leaks. On August 3, Gunna also appeared alongside Canadian rapper Nav on Travis Scott's single "Yosemite", a standout song from his third studio album, Astroworld, which happened to also be the highest-selling album of the year. The verse in the song, which was performed by Scott mimics Gunna's verse in "Sold Out Dates". The majority of the song's popularity went towards Gunna's appearance on the chorus.

On September 12, 2018, Gunna and Lil Baby released a collaborative single "Drip Too Hard", which would turn out as the lead single of their collaborative mixtape Drip Harder. The single peaked at number 4 on the Billboard Hot 100. The mixtape was released on October 5. It featured guest appearances from Lil Durk, Nav, Young Thug, and Drake. It peaked at number 4 on the Billboard 200.

2019: Drip or Drown 2

On February 1, 2019, Gunna released the single "One Call", which was certified platinum and serves as the lead single of his debut studio album, Drip or Drown 2. On February 11, he released the second and final single, "Speed it Up". The album was released on February 22, featuring guest appearances from fellow Atlanta rappers Lil Baby, Young Thug, and Playboi Carti, and charted at number three on the 200 Chart.

On August 16, 2019, he was featured on Young Thug's single "Hot" from the latter's debut studio album, So Much Fun. The song peaked at the number-one spot on Apple Music. The song was given a remix with an extra feature on a verse from Travis Scott on October 31 (Halloween), because of which the song eventually peaked at number 11 on the Billboard Hot 100. Gunna is also featured on "Surf" from the album, as well as "Diamonds" from the deluxe version, the latter which was released in December 2019.

2020–2022: Wunna, DS4EVER and Slime Language 2
In February 2020, Gunna was featured on three songs. He appeared on Pop Smoke's "Dior" remix, released on February 12. He was also featured on Marlo's "My Hood" alongside Roddy Ricch and London on da Track on A Boogie wit da Hoodie's song "Numbers", both released on February 14. Gunna later released a collaborative single with Nav, titled "Turks", featuring Travis Scott. The song was released on March 27, 2020, and serves as the lead single to Nav's third studio album, Good Intentions (Gunna is also featured on the track "Codeine" from the album). "Turks" marks the second time the three artists had collaborated on the same song following Scott's song "Yosemite". Six days later, on April 2, 2020, he released a collaborative track with producer Turbo and Young Thug, titled "Quarantine Clean", referencing the COVID-19 pandemic.

On March 6, 2020, he released "Skybox", the lead single of his second studio album, Wunna. It was released with an accompanying music video. On May 18, 2020, Gunna released the title track of the album, which was the second single. Four days later, on May 22, Gunna released the album. It features guest appearances from Young Thug, Nechie, Lil Baby, Roddy Ricch, and Travis Scott. The album debuted at number one on the Billboard 200, becoming his first number one album. On July 24, 2020, he released the deluxe edition, with eight more songs, featuring additional guest appearances from Yak Gotti, Future, Nav, and Lil Uzi Vert.

On August 14, 2020, Gunna and hip hop collective and record label Internet Money released the single "Lemonade", featuring Don Toliver and Nav.

On April 16, 2021, Gunna released a collaborative album with Young Thug and their record label Young Stoner Life titled Slime Language 2.

On January 7, 2022, Gunna released his third studio album, DS4Ever, which is the fourth and final installment in his Drip Season series. The album features guest appearances from Future, Young Thug, 21 Savage, Drake, Kodak Black, Chlöe, Lil Baby, G Herbo, Nechie, Chris Brown, Yung Bleu, and Roddy Ricch.

Philanthropy
In February 2022, Gunna teamed up with sustainable food waste management and hunger relief company Goodr to open a free grocery store at Ronald E. McNair Middle School, which he attended as a teenager.

Legal issues
In May 2022, Kitchens and Young Thug were among 28 persons associated with YSL who were charged in a 56-count Racketeer Influenced and Corrupt Organizations Act (RICO) indictment filed by Fulton County District Attorney Fani Willis. On May 11, 2022, Kitchens turned himself in to authorities. Kitchens was denied bond, and his trial was scheduled to begin January 9, 2023. On October 13, 2022, Kitchens was again denied release from jail ahead of his January trial. On December 14, 2022, Kitchens pleaded guilty to a single charge of racketeering and was sentenced to five years in prison, with one year commuted to time served and the rest of the sentence suspended subject to probation conditions, including 500 hours of community service; he was released from jail the same day.

Discography 

 Drip or Drown 2 (2019)
 Wunna (2020)
 DS4Ever (2022)

Awards and nominations

References

External links

 
 
 

1993 births
Living people
African-American male rappers
Rappers from Atlanta
21st-century American rappers
People from College Park, Georgia
Atlantic Records artists
21st-century African-American male singers
Crips
American hip hop singers
African-American male singer-songwriters
Trap musicians